Anete is a feminine given name, a variant spelling of Annette and may refer to:

Añete (born 1985), Spanish footballer
Anete Brice (born 1991), Latvian cross country skier
Anete Jēkabsone-Žogota (born 1983), Latvian basketball player
Anete Kociņa (born 1995), Latvian javelin thrower
Anete Muižniece-Brice (born 1962), Latvian basketball player
Anete Paulus (born 1991), Estonian footballer
Anete Šteinberga (born 1990), Latvian basketball player

See also
Anett

Feminine given names
Latvian feminine given names